Joe Barresi (nicknamed "Evil Joe") is an American record engineer and producer who has worked with Kyuss, The Melvins, Tool, Chevelle, Queens of the Stone Age, Coheed and Cambria, Tomahawk, L7, The Jesus Lizard, Parkway Drive, New Model Army, Bad Religion, Pennywise, Judas Priest, Soundgarden, Stam1na, Weezer, Avenged Sevenfold, Nine Inch Nails, and Slipknot.

Early life and education

Joe Barresi started playing guitar when he was seven, and played in local bands in and around his home in New York City and Florida. He studied classical guitar and music theory at the University of South Florida before graduating from the University of Miami, where he also studied piano and music engineering. As a student, Barresi began recording and developing local bands in Miami.

Career 
After graduating from college, Barresi moved to Los Angeles and began working his way up the ladder by working at numerous local studios—a move that helped him gain an understanding of the different consoles, rooms and clientele at the various studios. His first big break came when he engineered a demo for producer GGGarth Richardson. He went on to work with a number of well-respected producers including David Kahne, Michael Beinhorn, Rob Cavallo and Sylvia Massy.

Barresi has mixed tracks for Monster Magnet, Fair to Midland, Hole, Veruca Salt, Weezer, Rancid, Bauhaus, Anthrax, Skunk Anansie, and Alpha Galates.

Eventually Barresi gained enough experience and insight that he began producing records. He has produced or co-produced tracks for Clutch, Buckcherry, Fu Manchu, Loudmouth, The Melvins, L7 and others. He also produced the debut album by Queens of the Stone Age which, at the time, did not have a record deal. That album was eventually released by indie label Loose Groove. The self-titled album garnered attention from press, and the band soon landed a deal with Interscope Records. Barresi then engineered and mixed the Tool album 10,000 Days, a job he received after a recommendation from Buzz Osborne of The Melvins In 2011, he worked with the band Stam1na in Finland. Barresi engineered and mixed Tool's 2019 album Fear Inoculum

Today Joe Barresi has his own home studio JHOC (Joe's House of Compression) and is famous for developing certain recording techniques.

Discography

As producer

As mixer

As engineer

References

External links 
Joe Barresi website
McDonough Management
Platinum Samples - Joe Barresi "Evil Drums"
SF-EP-050 - Joe Barresi - Interview Special Features Podcast, March 18, 2015

Year of birth missing (living people)
Living people
Record producers from New York (state)
University of South Florida alumni
University of Miami alumni